St Agnes Church, Moseley is a Grade II listed parish church in the Church of England in Moseley, Birmingham.

History

It was designed by the architect William Davis in the Decorated Gothic style. Work started in 1883 and it opened in 1884.
The west tower was completed in 1932 by Charles Bateman.

St Agnes' Church is within the conservative evangelical tradition of the Church of England, and has passed resolutions to show that it rejects the ordination and/or leadership of women.

Organ

The church has a three manual pipe organ by William Hill & Sons. It was originally built for St Mark's Church, Leicester in 1871 but was moved to St Agnes’ Church and opened in 1994. A specification of the organ can be found on the National Pipe Organ Register.

See also

References

Moseley
Moseley
Moseley
Moseley
Moseley